Antônio Correia Pinto de Macedo Airport , formerly called Guarujá Federal Airport is the airport serving Lages, Brazil.

It is operated by Infracea.

Airlines and destinations
No scheduled flights operate at this airport.

Access

See also

List of airports in Brazil

References

External links

Airports in Santa Catarina (state)